Gelsomina is the Italian equivalent of the name Jasmine. It may refer to:

Gelsomina Verde, victim of the Camorra
Gelsomina Vono (born 1969), Italian politician
Gelsomina, character from the film La Strada
"Gelsomina" (Stars Shine In Your Eyes), song by Lucienne Delyle and composed by Nino Rota, from La Strada
Italian feminine given names